Sandip Tiwari is an Indian-born electrical engineer and applied physicist. He is the Charles N. Mellowes Professor of Engineering at Cornell University. His previous roles were Director of National Nanotechnology Users Network, Director of the National Nanotechnology Infrastructure Network, and research scientist at IBM T. J. Watson Research Center. He is best known for his pioneer research in the fields of SiGe transistor and nanocrystal memory.

Early life and education 
Sandip Tiwari was born in Ahmedabad, India, received his BTech from Indian Institute of Technology, Kanpur in 1976. He received his M.Eng. at Rensselaer Polytechnic Institute and PhD at Cornell University in 1980.

Work and academic career 
His early research career was at IBM's Research Division until 1999. During this period, he did the early work on compound semiconductor transistors and co-developed the first SiGe transistor. He also pioneered various quantum and nanoscale devices, such as the nanocrystal memory. The first demonstration of SiGe transistor was honored as IEEE International Electron Devices Meeting (IEDM) Top Industry Innovation of 1987. His work on nanocrystal memory was one of the 50 most-cited papers in the history of Applied Physics Letters in 2013.

At Cornell University, his Nanoscale ElectroScience Research Group focused on adaptive approaches for low power design, three-dimensional integration, inexact computing, and Bayesian implementations

Selected awards and honors 
 IEEE Cledo Brunetti Award, 2007
 IIT Kanpur Distinguished Alumni Award, 2003
 International Symposium on Compound Semiconductors (ISCS) Young Scientist Award, 1991
 Founding Editor-in-Chief of IEEE Transactions on Nanotechnology, 2002
 Guest Editor of Proceedings of the IEEE, 2015
 Fellow of American Physical Society, 1998
 Life Fellow of IEEE, 1994

Selected publications

Books 
 S. Tiwari, Quantum, Statistical and Information Mechanics: A Unified Introduction, Electroscience series, Vol. 1, Oxford University Press, 
 S. Tiwari, Device Physics: Fundamentals of Electronics and Optoelectronics, Electroscience series, Vol. 2, Oxford University Press, (2022)
 S. Tiwari, Semiconductor Physics: Principles, Theory and Nanoscale, Electroscience series, Vol. 3, Oxford University Press, (2020)
 S. Tiwari, Nanoscale Device Physics: Science and Engineering Fundamentals, Electroscience series, Vol. 4, Oxford University Press,  (2017)
 S. Tiwari, Compound Semiconductor Device Physics, Academic Press, Inc., (1992) and Elsevier,  (1992); Updated edition available as Open Text from group website

Papers 
 S. Tiwari, Implications of Scales in Processing of Information, Invited Paper, in Proceedings of the IEEE, vol. 103, no. 8, 1250-1273 (2015)

References 

Year of birth missing (living people)
Living people
Fellow Members of the IEEE
Fellows of the American Physical Society
Cornell University College of Engineering faculty
IIT Kanpur alumni
IBM Research computer scientists
Cornell University College of Engineering alumni
Indian electrical engineers
Indian physicists
Rensselaer Polytechnic Institute alumni